Not with My Wife, You Don't! (stylized as Not with MY Wife, You Don't!) is a 1966 American comedy film starred by Tony Curtis, Virna Lisi and George C. Scott. The film was nominated for a Golden Globe for Best Motion Picture – Musical/Comedy. The plot follows the standard  storyline of the long-running "road movies" popularized by Bob Hope, Bing Crosby and Dorothy Lamour, also products of the Norman Panama-Melvin Frank writing team.

The opening title sequence and interior sequences with an animated green monster were created by Saul Bass.

Plot
During the Korean War, Italian nurse Lieutenant Julietta Perodi (Virna Lisi), who has a passion of everything in "twos", falls in love with two United States Air Force pilots, Col. Tom Ferris (Tony Curtis) and Col. "Tank" Martin (George C. Scott). "Julie" marries Ferris after he convinces her that his friend, "Tank" has been killed in an aircraft crash. She soon discovers that Martin is alive, but remains happily married to Ferris until, Martin, her former love, re-enters their lives 14 years later.

London-based Ferris, now a military attache assigned to looking after military "brass", especially General Parker (Carroll O'Connor) has been neglectful of his wife. When Martin uses his influence to have Ferris shipped to Labrador for an Arctic survival course, she is prepared to seek a divorce. In the guise of an Arab potentate, Ferris, steals a V.I.P jet and wings it to Rome (which includes flying the jet through the London Tower Bridge along the route) to reconcile with his wife. Martin really wants to keep his single lifestyle, and can't see himself as the "marrying kind." Two years later, with their marriage on firmer grounds, the Ferris family has twin boys while Ferris continues making life easy for military V.I.P.'s, including the newly appointed Brig. Gen. Tank Martin, who is now flying with the United States Air Force Thunderbirds air demonstration team.

Cast
As appearing in screen credits (main roles identified):
 Tony Curtis as Colonel Tom Ferris
 Virna Lisi as Julie Ferris / Lieutenant Julietta Perodi
 George C. Scott as Colonel "Tank" Martin
 Carroll O'Connor as General Parker 
 Richard Eastham as General Walters
 Eddie Ryder as Sergeant Gilroy
 George Tyne as Sergeant Dogerty 
 Ann Doran as Doris Parker
 Donna Danton as Nurse Sally Ann
 Natalie Core as Lillian Walters
 Buck Young as Air Police Colonel
 Maurice Dallimore as BBC Commentator

Production
Filmed with the full cooperation of the United States Air Force, scenes of contemporary North American F-86 Sabre and North American F-100 Super Sabre fighters are shot in Technicolor. Principal photography took place in Labrador, Canada, London, Rome and Lazio, Italy, as well as in Washington, District of Columbia.

The writing team of Panama and Frank were basically reprising the successful road pictures formula that had worked well with Hope, Crosby and Lamour with Curtis, Scott and Lisi now taking on the similar roles in a "limp service comedy" as Scott's biographer, David Sheward characterized the slight film.  Essentially, the road picture had now moved into the air. The team of Peter Barnes and Larry Gelbart were brought in as screenwriters/ "doctors", but the plot line remained sophomoric. Panama resorted to a hodge-podge of effects, ranging from animated cartoons, to clips from foreign films and Mighty Joe Young with Bob Hope making a cameo appearance, which further accentuated the slapstick nature of the farce. Curtis later commented that he felt that casting had always remained an issue, as he was better suited to playing the "wolf" rather than the more passive character of the besieged husband.

Reception
Considered an amicable comedy typical of the period, critics like Bosley Crowther of The New York Times gave Not with My Wife, You Don't! a sympathetic review. "It is, nevertheless, the kind of farce that will someday look like a couple of million dollars in the context of the small screen's regular programing. It has been beautifully photographed in Technicolor and it has a competent cast headed by Tony Curtis, Virna Lisi and George C. Scott. And, on the small screen, its gags and situations may seem almost Shavian."

Variety saw a great deal in the film's lightweight premise, "Zesty scripting, fine performances, solid direction and strong production values sustain hilarity throughout."

Awards
Not with My Wife, You Don't! was nominated for the 1967 Golden Globe in the category of Best Motion Picture – Musical/Comedy.

Paperback novelization
Releasing it slightly in advance of the film (per normal for the era), Popular Library published a novelization of the screenplay, by Evan Lee Heyman, the author of several notable novelizations of the 1960s. Atypically, the book does not credit the source screenplay (allowing one to infer, incorrectly, that the novel came first), but the 1966 copyright is assigned to Warner Bros. Pictures, Inc.

See also
List of American films of 1966

References
Notes

Citations

Bibliography

 Curtis, Tony and Peter Golenbock. American Prince: A Memoir. New York: Three Rivers Press, 2009. .
 Sheward, David. Rage and Glory: The Volatile Life and Career of George C. Scott. New York: Applause Books, 2008. .

External links
 
 Not With My Wife, You Don’t! at Rotten Tomatoes
 

1966 comedy films
1966 films
American comedy films
Cold War films
American aviation films
1960s English-language films
Films directed by Norman Panama
Films with screenplays by Larry Gelbart
Films scored by John Williams
Warner Bros. films
Films set in London
Films set in Korea
1960s American films